Helena Magenbuch (born 14 March 1523 in Nuremberg; died 9 September 1597 in Hohenacker, was a German pharmacist.

She was the daughter of Johann Magenbuch, the personal physician of Martin Luther and Emperor Charles V. She was appointed scientific adviser to the duchess of Württemberg, Sibylla of Anhalt. She was awarded the title Pharmacist of the Württemberg court. This was a very uncommon position for a woman in this time period. She was succeeded by another woman, Maria Andreae.

References

1523 births
1597 deaths
16th-century German businesswomen
16th-century women scientists
German women scientists
Women pharmacologists
Women chemists
16th-century German scientists
German pharmacists